A research statement is a summary of research achievements and a proposal for upcoming research. It often includes both current aims and findings, and future goals. Research statements are usually requested as part of a relevant job application process, and often assist in the identification of appropriate applicants.

A typical research statement follows a typical pattern in regard to layout, and often includes features of other research documents including an abstract, research background and goals. Often these reports are tailored towards specific audiences, and may be used to showcase job proficiency or underline particular areas of research within a program.

Purpose of a Research Statement

The purpose of a research statement is to let the viewers (e.g. an academic student or a research committee) know the essence of the research document, the main points of the research and where the research will lead to later on. The later paragraphs of a statement might highlight the benefits that the research report will provide to its relevant subject field.
A research statement if done properly can be successful in answering the questions below:

 What is your interest in the research study?
 What were the unsolved questions that compelled a student to undertake the study?
 What are the major accomplishments that resulted from the study?
 What methodologies were used in collection and analysis of data for the research project?
 What were the factors that limited the scope of the research?
 What other challenges were encountered during the research and how were they overcome?
 What is the application of your research in society?
 What is the importance of the research project within its relevant field?
 Does your research pave the way for further studies in the field?

Academic researchers stress the point that a research statement cannot simply be answered by saying yes or no but is supported by valid evidences.

Content of the Research Statement

The content of a research statement is concerned with 3 main elements:

Research Statement Considerations for Recent Research 
The research statement of college students or recent graduates discusses the thesis required in college or university.

 It should enable a student who has created several research studies on similar topics, to create a link between them.
 It should discuss the student’s interest in the relevant academic field.
 It should discuss the importance, applications and the contribution it makes to the relevant field.
 It should briefly describe the contribution of every student in the research project, if the research was made as a team.
 It should include an acknowledgement of the work of other researchers in the field.

Research Statement Considerations for Future Research
 It should discuss the short-term goals of the research study you will do in the future.
 A few research concepts on which you plan to work should be listed.
 It should discuss how a recent piece of work paved the path for the research you plan to do.
 Discuss where you will get funds to sponsor the research project, who will be the collaborative partners and what facilities will be used by you.
 It will discuss in what ways the research objectives match with your departmental objectives.
 It will discuss the long-term goals of the research studies, i.e. the objectives that it hopes to achieve after more than five years.

Research Statement Considerations for Details
 It should discuss the research plan in practical and realistic ways.
 It should give due attention to the highlights of the research but should not go into too much details.
 To support the research, some illustrations, graphs and charts should also be included.

Research Statements for Quantitative Research
Some of the main research statements for quantitative researches are

Descriptive Research Statements
Relational Research Statements
Difference Research Statements

Quantitative research statements are based on the logic of deduction and reasoning and are formed by identifying the variables of a general theory and observing a few selected variables.

Research Statements for Qualitative Research

Some of the main research statements for qualitative researches are

Ethnographic research statements
Historical research statements
Legal research statements

Qualitative research statements are based on inductive reasoning and are restated several times during the collection of data. They explain what influence qualitative statements or variables have in decision making under uncertain conditions.

Types of Research Statements

Usually two types of research statements are formed for a research paper.

Objective Research Statement: An objective research statement gives a balanced overview of the whole of the research study.
Subjective Research Statement: The subjective research statement is based on the results of research analysis.

Bad Practices of Research Statements

Below are some of the reasons many research proposals are turned down by research committees.

The research study is trivial and does not contribute beneficially to the relevant field.
The research statement is built on a hypothesis that is unstable and lacks enough evidence to be compelling.
The statement relates to only a limited area and hence does not address the mainstream issues of its field.
The research statement is too broad in scope requiring analysis of multiple variables at once.
The research statement does not fully grasp the complexity of the research study.

See also
Thesis
Grey Literature
Quantitative research
Qualitative research
Research proposal

References

External links
One Strategy for Writing a Research Statement
Research Statements
Writing a Research Plan
Rules of the Research Statement
Research Statement
Writing Research Statements
Dissertation Outline

Academic terminology